This is a list of mayors of Rapperswil-Jona, Switzerland. The mayor (Stadtpräsident) of Rapperswil-Jona chairs the seven member city council (Stadtrat). Before 2007, Jona and Rapperswil were separate and had each a mayor.

Rapperswil

Rapperswil-Jona 

People from Rapperswil-Jona
Rapperswil-Jona